Kłączno  is a village in Gmina Studzienice, Bytów County, Pomeranian Voivodeship, in northern Poland, approximately  southeast of Bytów and  southwest of Gdańsk (capital city of the Pomeranian Voivodeship).

From 1975 to 1998 it was in Słupsk Voivodeship.

It had a population of 141 in 2004.

References

Map of the Gmina Studzienice

Villages in Bytów County